The Copa ES, or Copa Espírito Santo is a competition contested in the second semester of the year, by Espírito Santo state teams, to determine a spot in the following year's Copa do Brasil and Copa Verde.

Participants

Following is the list with all the clubs who disputes the Copa ES by year.

2022 season

List of champions

Titles by team

Teams in bold still active.

By city

References

External links
FES Official Website

Football competitions in Espírito Santo